Øksnes is a municipality in Nordland county, Norway. It is located on the northwestern part of the large island of Langøya, which is a part of the traditional region of Vesterålen. The administrative centre of the municipality is the village of Myre. Other villages in Øksnes include Alsvåg, Barkestad, Breidstrand, Nyksund, Strengelvåg, and Stø.

The  municipality is the 257th largest by area out of the 356 municipalities in Norway. Øksnes is the 193rd most populous municipality in Norway with a population of 4,458.

General information

The municipality of Øksnes was established on 1 January 1838 (see formannskapsdistrikt law). On 1 January 1866, a small area of southern Øksnes (population: 40) was transferred to the neighboring Bø Municipality. On 1 July 1919, the northeastern part of Øksnes along the Gavlfjorden (population: 1,085) was separated to form the new Langenes Municipality. This left Øksnes with 2,296 residents.

During the 1960s, there were many municipal mergers across Norway due to the work of the Schei Committee. On 1 January 1964, the Krakberget area and the part of Øksnes on the peninsula north of Krakberget (population: 271) was transferred to the neighboring municipality of Bø. On the same date the municipality of Langenes was merged with Øksnes. Prior to the merger, Øksnes had 3,112 residents and Langenes had 2,037 residents.

Name
The municipality (originally the parish) is named after the old Øksnes farm (Old Norse: Yxnes), since the first Øksnes Church was built there. The first element is probably an old name of Skogsøya island (Old Norse: Yxn) and the last element is nes which means "headland". The old name of the island is identical with the word yxn (plural form of uxi which means "ox"). The mountains of the island have maybe been compared with a group of oxen.

Coat of arms
The coat of arms was granted on 22 August 1986. The official blazon is "Or two hooks addorsed sable". This means the arms have a field (background) that  has a tincture of Or which means it is commonly colored yellow, but if it is made out of metal, then gold is used. The charge is two black fishing hooks. The design was chosen to symbolize a municipality which is dependent on fishing and sailing. The hooks were based on the bone hooks that were used for fishing in this area prior to 17th century. The arms were designed by Arvid Sveen.

Churches
The Church of Norway has one parish within the municipality of Øksnes. It is part of the Vesterålen prosti (deanery) in the Diocese of Sør-Hålogaland.

Environment

Geography

Øksnes municipality encompasses the northwestern part of the island of Langøya in the Vesterålen archipelago. It also includes many small islands around there including the islands of Anden, Dyrøya, Nærøya, Skogsøya, and Tindsøya. The Gavlfjorden flows along the northeastern part of the boundary with Andøy Municipality on the other side. The southeastern part of Øksnes borders Sortland Municipality and the southwestern part borders Bø Municipality (both municipalities are also located on Langøya island). The rest of the municipality borders the Norwegian Sea.

The municipality is quite rugged with the exception of the area east of Myre which is very flat and marshy. The large lake Alsvågvatnet lies near this flat area, just east of the village of Alsvåg. This flat area lies just to the north of the large mountain Snøkolla. The Anda Lighthouse is located on the tiny island of Anden.

Important Bird Area
An area of about 6000 ha at the north-eastern end of the island, comprising coastal lagoons, fens, transition mires, springs and mudflats, including the Grunnfjorden nature reserve and Grunnfjorden Ramsar site as well as other wetlands, has been designated an Important Bird Area (IBA) by BirdLife International (BLI) because it supports populations of pink-footed and barnacle geese on passage migration.

Climate

Government
All municipalities in Norway, including Øksnes, are responsible for primary education (through 10th grade), outpatient health services, senior citizen services, unemployment and other social services, zoning, economic development, and municipal roads. The municipality is governed by a municipal council of elected representatives, which in turn elect a mayor.  The municipality falls under the Vesterålen District Court and the Hålogaland Court of Appeal.

Municipal council
The municipal council of Øksnes is made up of 21 representatives that are elected to four year terms. The party breakdown of the council is as follows:

Mayor
The mayors of Øksnes (incomplete list):
1967-1973: Finn Knutsen (Ap)
1991-1999: Finn Knutsen (Ap)
2003-2007: Per-Ole Larsen (Sp)
2007-2011: John H. Danielsen (Ap)
2011-2015: Jørn Martinussen (H)
2015-2019: Karianne Bråthen (Ap)
2019–present: John H. Danielsen (Sp)

Notable people 
 Oskar J. W. Hansen (1892 in Langenes – 1971) a naturalized American sculptor, worked at the Hoover Dam
 Lydolf Lind Meløy (1908  in Meløya – 1999) a Norwegian educator, trade unionist and politician
 Finn Knutsen (born 1932 in Langenes) a Norwegian politician, frequent Mayor of Øksnes
 Ove Kristian Sundberg (1932 in Øksnes – 2019) a church musician, musicologist and historian of ideas
 Maria Solheim (born 1982 in Alsvåg) a Norwegian singer-songwriter

References

External links
Municipal fact sheet from Statistics Norway 

 
Municipalities of Nordland
Populated places of Arctic Norway
Vesterålen
1838 establishments in Norway
Important Bird Areas of Norway
Important Bird Areas of Arctic islands
Nature reserves in Norway
Ramsar sites in Norway